Aasiya Kazi (born 12 December 1991)  is an Indian television actress best known for her role of Santu Dharamraj Mahiyavanshi in the television soap opera Bandini on Imagine TV.

 She also played the role of Saudamini in Colors TV and Hema Malini’s Matti Ki Banno, Kastur Galla in Imagine TV's Dharampatni, Dr. Shweta Kapoor / Shweta Rishi Kumar in Zee TV's Hitler Didi, Ruku in Na Bole Tum Na Maine Kuch Kaha 2  on Colors TV, as Ganga in Balika Vadhu, and Sharda in Tenali Rama.

Television

References

External links

Living people
1991 births
Actresses from Mumbai
Indian television actresses
Indian soap opera actresses
Actresses in Hindi television
21st-century Indian actresses